Camp Thomas was a United States Regular Army training facility in Ohio during the American Civil War.

Camp Thomas may also refer to:

 Camp Thomas (Rhode Island), a former United States Navy camp, part of Davisville Naval Construction Battalion Center
 Camp George H. Thomas, name of the Chickamauga and Chattanooga National Military Park, Georgia, during the Spanish–American War
 Fort Thomas, Arizona, formerly Camp Thomas

See also

Camp Thomas A. Scott, Fort Wayne, Indiana